Judith Osimbo Omondi (born 8 August 1999), known as Judith Osimbo, is a Kenyan footballer who plays as a goalkeeper for Gaspo Women and the Kenya women's national team.

International career
Osimbo capped for Kenya at senior level during the 2019 CECAFA Women's Championship and the 2020 Turkish Women's Cup.

See also
List of Kenya women's international footballers

References

External links

1999 births
Living people
Footballers from Nairobi
Kenyan women's footballers
Women's association football goalkeepers
Kenya women's international footballers